FC RUOR-Guardia Bishkek is a football club based in Bishkek, Kyrgyzstan that played in the top division in Kyrgyzstan, the Kyrgyzstan League.

History 
1994: Founded as FC AiK Bishkek.
1998: Renamed FC National Guard-AiK Bishkek.
1998: Renamed FC National Guard Bishkek.
1999: Renamed FC SKNG Guardia Bishkek.
2001: Renamed FC RUOR-Guardia Bishkek.

Achievements 
Kyrgyzstan League
2rd place: 1996
3rd place: 1998
Kyrgyzstan Cup
Winner: 1996

Current squad

External links 
Career stats by KLISF

Football clubs in Kyrgyzstan
Football clubs in Bishkek
1994 establishments in Kyrgyzstan
Military association football clubs